Dániel Angyal (born 29 March 1992) is a Hungarian water polo player. He competed in the 2020 Summer Olympics.

References

1992 births
Living people
Water polo players from Budapest
Water polo players at the 2020 Summer Olympics
Hungarian male water polo players
Medalists at the 2020 Summer Olympics
Olympic bronze medalists for Hungary in water polo
21st-century Hungarian people